TLC is a television channel operated in Turkey. It replaced CNBC-e in November 2015. It's available in Tivibu, Turkcell TV+, Türksat 4A, Digiturk, D-Smart and KabloTV. It's also available in its Turkish website.

Logos

References

External links 
  

Turkish companies established in 2015
Television stations in Turkey
Television channels and stations established in 2015
Turkey